A glasspack is a type of automobile muffler in which the exhaust gas passes straight through the center of the muffler. The basic design consists of one smaller tube centered inside of a larger outer tube that is enlarged or swollen in the middle.  The gap between the swollen part of the larger outer tube and the smaller diameter center tube is packed full of fiberglass, hence the name.

Glasspacks are an old, simple, and relatively inexpensive muffler design that are effective at reducing back pressure, but not very effective at muffling noise. They are usually easy to identify by their simple tube design. Most are painted or powder coated red, but not all.

United States
Glasspack mufflers were originally offered in the United States by Cherry Bomb in 1968. Since then, the name of Glasspack is closely associated with this brand name, yet today that is not the only company that produces Glasspack mufflers. The distinctive features of the Glasspack mufflers are traditional red powder coating, original straight-through construction and fiberglass inner tube, and its distinctive classic sound. A longer glasspack will reduce noise to a greater extent than a shorter one. Sound is also dissipated into the fiberglass damping material. Other glasspack mufflers have perforated louvers punched into the center core which can reduce total flow capacity. The turbulence created by the perforated louvers therefore achieves greater muffling capacity at the expense of total volume of air flow.  The more turbulence created, the greater the muffling & less total air flow / power production capacity.  Depending on the directionality of the louvers, one can choose between slightly higher flow capacity or slightly greater muffling.  This lower flow but slightly quieter design approach is commonly used in glasspack mufflers.

Some modern muffler designs are similar in principle to the glasspack, but use more sophisticated sound-absorbing materials such as stainless steel mesh, and more advanced acoustical engineering, reducing noise while retaining the power-preserving advantages of a straight-through exhaust flow.

Outside the United States
Glasspacks and other modifications that increase the noise level of exhaust systems are illegal in the United Kingdom.

See also

 Aftermarket exhaust parts
 Exhaust system
 Modified car
 Boy racer

References

External links
Diagram of glass pack muffler

Exhaust systems
Vehicle modifications